Danny In 't Ven (born 8 August 1968) is a Belgian former professional road cyclist. His father Willy and uncle Paul were also professional cyclists. He competed in the 1993 Vuelta a España and finished 95th overall.

Major results

1986
 1st  Time trial, National Junior Road Championships
1988
 1st Stage 2 Tour of Belgium amateurs
1989
 1st Stage 2 Tour of Belgium amateurs
1990
 1st  Time trial, National Amateur Road Championships
1991
 1st  Time trial, National Amateur Road Championships
 1st Stage 2 (ITT) Tour de Liège
 2nd Overall Tour of Belgium amateurs
1st Stage 3b (ITT)
1992
 1st Overall Tour cycliste de l'Essonne
1st Stage 3b
 1st Prologue & Stage 3 Milk Race
1993
 10th Omloop van het Houtland
 10th Ronde van Limburg
1994
 1st Boucle de l'Artois
 2nd Overall Tour of Belgium amateurs
1st Stages 2 & 3 (ITT)
 2nd Flèche Ardennaise
 2nd Kattekoers
1995
 1st Overall Tweedaagse van de Gaverstreek
1st Stage 1
 1st Omloop Het Volk Amateurs
 1st Stage 1 Triptyque Ardennais
 1st Stage 4 Circuit Franco-Belge
 1st Stage 13 Fresca Classic
1996
 1st Overall Tour de Liège
1st Stages 1 & 6 (ITT)
 3rd Grand Prix de Beuvry-la-Forêt
 9th Overall Tour de la Region Wallonne
1997
 1st Internationale Wielertrofee Jong Maar Moedig
1998
 1st Stage 4 Tour de Liège
1999
 1st Overall Tour de Liège
1st Stage 6 (ITT)
2000
 2nd Overall Ronde de l'Oise
2002
 1st Grand Prix de Beuvry-la-Forêt
 2nd Internationale Wielertrofee Jong Maar Moedig
2003
 1st Stages 4, 14 & 17 International Cycling Classic
 3rd De Drie Zustersteden
 8th Vlaamse Havenpijl

References

1968 births
Living people
Belgian male cyclists
Sportspeople from Turnhout
Cyclists from Antwerp Province